A single-track vehicle is a vehicle that leaves a single ground track as it moves forward. Single-track vehicles usually have little or no lateral stability when stationary but develop it when moving forward or controlled. In the case of wheeled vehicles, the front and rear wheel usually follow slightly different paths when turning or when out of alignment. 

Single-track vehicles have unique dynamics that, in the case of wheeled vehicles, are discussed at length in bicycle and motorcycle dynamics, that usually require leaning into a turn, and that usually include countersteering. Single-track vehicles can roll on wheels, slide, float, or hydroplane.

Wheeled
bicycle, tandem bicycle, tall bike, and recumbent bicycle
motorcycle, scooter, and feet forwards motorcycle
gyrocar and gyro monorail
kick scooter
unicycle, self-balancing unicycle, Uno (dicycle), and monowheel
inline skate and roller ski (when only one is in contact with the ground or when the second follows behind the first)

Sliding
the snowboard and monoski
the skirider
the ice skate (when only one is in contact with the ice or when the second follows behind the first)

Intermittent contact
the pogo stick
the bipedal robot

Hydroplaning
the slalom water ski
the wakeboard

Narrow-track vehicle

A vehicle is approximately single-track when the axle track is small enough with respect to the center of mass height to require leaning into a turn. Countersteering may or may not be required.
the skateboard and all its varieties, such as the snakeboard
the surfboard
the caster board (when the rear wheel closely follows the front wheel)
the Uno dicycle

See also
Dicycle
List of land vehicles types by number of wheels

Vehicles by type